Dayworld Rebel is a 1987 science fiction novel by American writer Philip José Farmer, the second book in the Dayworld Trilogy.

Plot summary
In this sequel, Jeff Caird has created a new personality for himself submerging his previous personalities, including his primary personality.
He now goes by the name William St.-George Duncan. He has no memory of his previous personalities.
He successfully engineers a daring escape from his captors and manages to connect with a rebel organization of Daybreakers.
Throughout the novel, he discovers the true nature of the ruling government and the rebel organization.

See also
Philip José Farmer bibliography

1987 American novels
Dystopian novels
Overpopulation fiction
Novels by Philip José Farmer
1987 science fiction novels
Books with cover art by Don Ivan Punchatz